1–6 Walnut Terrace in the Newtonville village of Newton, Massachusetts is a distinctive Shingle style rowhouse.  Built in 1887, it is one of the city's few examples of a 19th-century rowhouse.  The building was listed on the National Register of Historic Places in 1986.

Description and history
Walnut Terrace is a short spur road on the north side of Newtonville, extending from Central Avenue in the east to the rear of a commercial block fronting onto Walnut Street, one of the village's commercial thoroughfares.  It is little more than an access drive for this rowhouse, which is on its north side.  It is a wood frame building, with three brick firewalls, stepped at the tops, separating it into four sections.  The end sections have front-facing gabled roofs with gabled dormers at the ends, while the center sections have side-gable roofs with dormers that have recessed windows.  The two center units have single-story projecting rectangular bays, while the units flanking those have projecting rounded bays.  The deeply recessed entries were originally Queen Anne in style, with sidelight and transom windows, but have modernized.

The rowhouse was built in 1887 by William Claflin, a Newtonville resident and former Governor of Massachusetts.  He was also one of Newtonville's principal real estate developers, owning a number of commercial and residential properties in the village.  This is the oldest multiunit housing of its type in Newton, most of whose housing stock is less densely built single-family residences.

See also
 National Register of Historic Places listings in Newton, Massachusetts

References

National Register of Historic Places in Newton, Massachusetts
Buildings and structures in Newton, Massachusetts
Residential buildings on the National Register of Historic Places in Massachusetts
Queen Anne architecture in Massachusetts
Residential buildings completed in 1887